Nastasya Generalova (born January 19, 2000 in Beverly Hills, California) is an American individual rhythmic gymnast.

Personal life
Generalova's mother, Olga Generalova, immigrated to the United States from Russia, and her father is African-American.  Generalova was raised by her mother.  She began training in gymnastics in 2004. Generalova attended Palisades Charter High School, and graduated in 2018.  Nastasya Generalova committed to Columbia University. She appeared in Taylor Swift's music video "Shake It Off", performing as one of the rhythmic gymnasts.

Gymnastics career 
Junior

In 2013, Generalova competed at her first U.S. Rhythmic Championships, placing 1st in clubs, 2nd in hoop, and 5th in all-around. In 2014, she placed 4th in ball, 6th in hoop, 7th in clubs, and 5th in all-around at the USA Gymnastics Championships. She began competing internationally in 2014. She was first in all-around, hoop and ball at the 2014 International Tournament of Pas de Calais. Generalova was a member of the junior team at the 2014 Pacific Rim Championships where Team USA won the gold medal, and she placed second in the all-around. She won bronze in the all-around and silver in the clubs at the 2015 Irina Deleanu Cup.

Senior

In the 2016 season, Generalova began competing as a senior.  Generalova competed in her first World Cup at the 2016 Tashkent World Cup finishing 7th in the all-around and qualified to all 4 apparatus finals. At her next event, the 2016 Sofia World Cup, she finished 12th in all-around. Before the 2016 Olympics, Generalova was profiled in the Lifetime series Gold Medal Families. She finished 5th in all-around at the 2016 USA Gymnastics National Championships and was not selected for the Olympic Team.

In the 2017 season, Generalova competed at the Kiev Grand Prix finishing 6th in the all-around and qualified to 3 apparatus finals. She then finished 10th in all-around at the Tashkent World Cup and placed 7th in clubs final. At the World Challenge Cup in the Portimao World Cup, Generalova finished 5th in all-around and qualified to 3 apparatus finals, winning her first medal in a World Cup, taking bronze in ball,  with a 4th place in hoop and 5th in ribbon.

In the 2018 season, on March 15–18, Generalova competed at the 2018 Grand Prix Kiev finishing 5th in the all-around, she qualified in 3 apparatus finals and finished 6th in hoop, ball and clubs. On March March 24–25, she then finished 12th in the all-around at the 2018 Thiais Grand Prix. On April 20–22, at the 2018 Tashkent World Cup, Generalova finished 15th in the all-around and did not qualify in any apparatus finals. At the 2018 Pan American Championships, she took silver in ball and clubs.

In February 2019, Generalova started her season by competing at the Rhythmic Challenge in Indianapolis, finishing second with ball, third all-around and with clubs and ribbon, and fourth with hoop. In April, she competed at Thiais Grand Prix, finishing 17th all-around. On May 4–5, Generalova competed at the Guadalajara World Challenge Cup, finishing eleventh all-around and qualifying to the ribbon final. She placed seventh in the final. At the Rhythmic Elite Qualifier on May 19, Generalova won gold with clubs and bronze in all-around. At the USA Gymnastics Championships in July, Generalova won clubs bronze, finished fourth all-around and with hoop, placed fifth with ball and sixth with ribbon.

Modeling career 
Generalova is signed to Wilhelmina Models. She has appeared in Teen Vogue.

References

External links 
 
 
 

2000 births
Living people
American rhythmic gymnasts
Sportspeople from Beverly Hills, California
African-American female gymnasts
American people of Russian descent
Columbia University alumni
21st-century African-American sportspeople
21st-century African-American women
20th-century African-American sportspeople
20th-century African-American women
20th-century African-American people